Oratory of Saint Stephen ( is a Roman Catholic chapel in the town of Lentate sul Seveso, in the Province of Monza and Brianza and the region of Lombardy, Italy.

History
The plain Gothic-style brick two-story structure is located in the town center, next to the parish church of San Vito Martire. Construction took place in 1369, commissioned by Stefano Porro, an ambassador to the court of Bernabò and Galeazzo Visconti, who was made a palatine count by the Holy Roman Emperor Charles IV in 1368. The outside appears dilapidated. The entrance to the single nave is through a stairwell dipping below the right of the façade, above is a mullioned window with an ogival window frame. Despite restoration in the 1930s and 1960s, the frescoes are threatened by humidity.

Interior Decoration
The interior walls of the church contain frescos by Anovelo da Imbonate who also painted the image above the front portal. Imbonate is a painter of the school of Giovanni da Milano who was a direct disciple of Giotto.  The three walls around the oratory is covered with the cycle of frescoes of the life of Saint Stephen.

Among other frescoes is the work by an anonymous painter called the "Maestro di Lentate". This is representative of a late-Gothic art school called the International Gothic style.

References

Churches in the province of Monza and Brianza
14th-century Roman Catholic church buildings in Italy
Churches completed in 1369
Gothic architecture in Lombardy